April Brandley (née Letton; born 19 April 1990) is a professional Australian netball player in the Suncorp Super Netball league. She plays in the positions of GK, GD and WD, and has been selected on several occasions for the Australia national netball team.

Career

Domestic
Brandley was a temporary replacement player for the Queensland Firebirds in 2011 and played for the New South Wales Swifts in 2012. At the end of the 2014 ANZ Championship season, Brandley signed with the Perth-based West Coast Fever for two seasons. Since 2017 she has played for the Collingwood Magpies. At the Magpies she has established herself as a first-choice defender, and she was re-signed by the club at the end of the 2018 season. After the 2019 season Brandley announced she was pregnant and intended to step away from the game in 2020. However she returned to the game the following year as a training partner for Giants Netball, after the start of the Super Netball season was pushed back to August due to the COVID-19 pandemic.

Super Netball statistics
Statistics are correct to the end of the 2018 season.

|- style="background-color: #eaeaea"
! scope="row" style="text-align:center" | 2017
|style="text-align:center;"|Magpies
| 0/0 || 0 || 8 || 36 || 0 || 16 || 56 || 216 || 11 || 15 
|- 
! scope="row" style="text-align:center" | 2018
|style="text-align:center;"|Magpies
| 0/0 || 1 || 3 || 44 || 2 || 20 || 39 || 157 || 22 || 13
|- class="sortbottom"
! colspan=2| Career
! 0/0
! 1
! 11
! 80
! 2
! 36
! 95
! 373
! 33
! 28
|}

International
She participated in the 2010 World Netball Series and 2011 World Netball Series, both in Liverpool, UK. Her good form at the Collingwood Magpies in the 2018 season resulted in her being was selected in the Australian Diamonds squad for the 2018/19 international season. Brandley was part of the Australian team that finished second and won a silver medal at the 2019 Netball World Cup.

Accolades

ANZ Championship accolades
 2012 NSW Swifts Players' Player

National team
 2018 Australian Diamonds (2018 Commonwealth Games)
 2013 Australian Diamonds (Tour of England)
 2010-2012 Fast5 team

Netball career facts
 Childhood club: Heathcote Waratah NC
 2011 Diamonds training partner
 2011 NNSW Waratahs – undefeated premiers
 2011 NSW 21/U Team captain - premiers
 2011 21/U National Netball Championship MVP
 2011 ANZ Championship victory with QLD Firebirds (replacement player)
 2010 21/U National Netball Championship co-MVP
 2010 AIS Anne Clark Award
 NSW Representative 2005–2011, winning 11 National Championships

References

External links
 Magpies Netball profile
 Suncorp Super Netball profile
 Netball Draft Central profile
 Netball Australia profile

1990 births
Living people
New South Wales Swifts players
West Coast Fever players
Collingwood Magpies Netball players
Australia international netball players
Netball players at the 2018 Commonwealth Games
Commonwealth Games medallists in netball
Commonwealth Games silver medallists for Australia
2019 Netball World Cup players
Suncorp Super Netball players
Australian Netball League players
Netball New South Wales Waratahs players
Australian Institute of Sport netball players
Australia international Fast5 players
Queensland Firebirds players
Giants Netball players
Medallists at the 2018 Commonwealth Games